Girdharilal Mahiya (born 1 January 1958) is an Indian politician, elected member from the Dungargarh constituency of Rajasthan. He is a member of the 15th Legislative Assembly of Rajasthan. He is a member of the Communist Party of India (Marxist).

Political career 
Girdharilal Mahiya was elected sarpanch of Dulchasar Gram Panchayat in 2015.
Mahiya started his career in 2018 Dungargarh Assembly Elections, winning by 72376 (40.50%) votes.

Election 
Mahiya initially refused to contest the election citing his financial condition, but was fielded by the CPI (M) after collecting donations from the public.

References

Living people
Communist Party of India (Marxist) politicians from Rajasthan
Rajasthan MLAs 2018–2023
1958 births